West Coast vs. Wessex is a split album by the American punk rock band NOFX and the British folk punk artist Frank Turner. The split was released on July 31, 2020 by Fat Wreck Chords and it features covers of each other's songs, five by NOFX and five by Frank Turner.

Release 
The collaboration and its title, cover art and the track listing was first publicly announced on June 1, 2020. Two songs of the album were made available for digital streaming, namely "Thatcher Fucked the Kids" by NOFX (originally by Frank Turner) and "Bob" by Frank Turner (originally by NOFX). Two accompanying music videos were also released. "Falling in Love" was made available for streaming at the end of the month, on June 29. The entire album was made available for streaming on July 30. West Coast vs. Wessex was officially released by Fat Wreck Chords on July 31.

West Coast vs. Wessex is the final Frank Turner release to feature longtime drummer Nigel Powell.

Background 
The title of West Coast vs. Wessex respectively refers to the West Coast of the United States, where NOFX is from, and to Wessex, a region in the deep south of England where Frank Turner is from.

Frank Turner and NOFX's front man Fat Mike had already discussed the possibility of recording a split album over the course of previous years, including the approach they would take. On West Coast vs. Wessex both acts aimed to interpret each other's songs differently than they were originally performed. When the two decided to actually record the split album, they also decided not to discuss the collaboration with each other, so Frank Turner wouldn't have any input in NOFX's covers and vice versa. According to Frank Turner:

About the choice of the songs, Frank Turner noted that he picked the NOFX songs he thought he could play differently, noting that he also picked some lesser-known NOFX songs.

Fat Mike admitted taking a similar approach. Fat Mike also noted that since Frank Turner only chose to cover NOFX songs from the '90s, he would also cover some of Frank Turner's earlier work.

While "Perfect Government"' is a song mostly associated with NOFX, it was actually written by Mark Curry, a friend of the band who played a crucial role for El Hefe to join NOFX.

Track listing 

 "Substitute" (NOFX) - 2:45
 "Worse Things Happen at Sea" (NOFX) - 3:19
 "Thatcher Fucked the Kids" (NOFX) - 3:07
 "Ballad of Me and My Friends" (NOFX) - 1:50
 "Glory Hallelujah" (NOFX) - 3:27
 "Scavenger Type" (Frank Turner) - 1:43
 "Bob" (Frank Turner) - 3:08
 "Eat the Meek" (Frank Turner) - 3:57
 "Perfect Government" (Frank Turner) - 2:26
 "Falling in Love" (Frank Turner) - 4:08

Personnel

Performers 
NOFX
 Fat Mike - vocals, bass
 El Hefe - guitar, vocals
 Eric Melvin - guitar, vocals
 Erik Sandin - drums

Frank Turner & The Sleeping Souls
 Frank Turner - vocals, guitar
 Ben Lloyd - guitar, vocals
 Tarrant Anderson - bass
 Matt Nasir - piano, keyboards, vocals
 Nigel Powell - drums, percussion, vocals

Additional performers
 Tim Brennan - accordion (track 10)

Production 
 Chris Hesse - mixing (tracks 1–5), mastering
 Tristan Ivemy - mixing (tracks 6-10)
 D-Composers - production (tracks 1–5)

References 

2020 albums
Fat Wreck Chords albums
Frank Turner albums
NOFX albums
Split albums